The first season of Superstore, the U.S. television series, was ordered on January 14, 2015. The series was picked up by NBC on May 7, 2015. It debuted on November 30, 2015, with a two-episode premiere. The series was created by Justin Spitzer, who also serves as an executive producer. The season ended on February 22, 2016. The first season originally had an episode order of 13 episodes, but it was later trimmed by NBC to 11 episodes due to scheduling, and The Voice returning to schedule.

Superstore follows a group of employees working at Cloud 9, a fictional big-box store in St. Louis, Missouri. The ensemble and supporting cast features America Ferrera, Ben Feldman, Lauren Ash, Colton Dunn, Nico Santos, Nichole Bloom and Mark McKinney.

Cast

Main cast
 America Ferrera as Amy Dubanowski
 Ben Feldman as Jonah Simms
 Lauren Ash as Dina Fox
 Colton Dunn as Garrett McNeil
 Nico Santos as Mateo Fernando Aquino Liwanag
 Nichole Bloom as Cheyenne Tyler Lee
 Mark McKinney as Glenn Sturgis

Recurring cast
 Johnny Pemberton as Bo Derek Thompson
 Josh Lawson as Tate

Co-starring cast
 Kaliko Kauahi as Sandra
 Linda Porter as Myrtle
 Sean Whalen as Sal

Guest cast
 Eliza Coupe as Cynthia
 Isabelle Day as Emma Dubanowski
 Ryan Gaul as Adam Dubanowski
 Jon Barinholtz as Marcus
 Dan Bucatinsky as Steve

Episodes

Production

Development
The series was one of three pilots picked up by NBC on January 14, 2015, along with the sitcom Crowded; both were green lighted to series status the same day (May 7, 2015).
The series was the first project for Ruben Fleischer's newly formed company The District as part of a two-year deal with Universal, as he directed the pilot episode. Superstore was officially picked up as a series on May 7, 2015, by NBC. The first season consisted of eleven episodes, after the episode order was reduced from thirteen on October 19, 2015. It was announced on November 2, 2015, that the show would air the premiere on January 4, 2016, but would be airing two back-to-back episodes on November 30, 2015, following The Voice. A promotional poster was released on November 2, 2015.

Casting
It was announced on February 20, 2015, that Lauren Ash had been cast as a series regular, and would be playing Dina, the store’s assistant manager. On March 2, 2015, Deadline reported that Superstore had added three other cast members, which was Colton Dunn, Mark McKinney and Nico Santos. The website reported that Dunn would be playing Garrett, the often-sarcastic narrator of the piece, McKinney would be playing Glenn, the intensely religious store manager, and Santos would be playing Mateo, another new employee and a brown-noser from an impoverished background. On March 12, 2015, Nichole Bloom was announced to have joined the show as Cheyenne, a very pregnant teenage employee.

Deadline announced on March 13, 2015, that Ben Feldman had landed the male lead in Superstore, as Jonah, a new employee in the superstore Cloud 9. Three days later, TVLine announced on March 16, 2015, that America Ferrera had landed the female lead as the floor supervisor Amy in the Cloud 9 store. It was also reported that Ferrera was also a producer for the show.

Reception

Critical reception
On Metacritic, the first season has a score of 58 out of 100, indicating "mixed or average reviews" based on reviews from 21 critics. On Rotten Tomatoes, the first season has a 54% rating, based on reviews from 24 critics, with an average rating of 4.4/10. The site's consensus is: "Superstores talented cast and obvious potential are slightly overshadowed by a tonally jumbled presentation and thin, formulaic writing." 

As the first season went along, reviews started to become more positive. Following the finale "Labor", the Los Angeles Times called it one of TV's best new comedies." Pilot Viruet of The A.V. Club wrote that the "first season ... got better and more confident as it moved on", and that the first-season finale "is a nice little cap to a nice little sitcom that could’ve used a little more attention." After the series aired its Olympics special, Variety wrote that the show was "a funny, pointed and essential workplace comedy", and that "there are no weak links in [the] ensemble".

Ratings

Home media

References

External links
 
 
 

Superstore (TV series)
2015 American television seasons
2016 American television seasons